Macropsini is a tribe of leafhoppers in the family Cicadellidae, formerly treated as a subfamily but now considered to belong within the subfamily Eurymelinae.

Genera
 Archipedionis Dietrich & Thomas, 2018
 Galboa Distant, 1909
 Hephathus Ribaut, 1952
 Macropsella Hamilton, 1980
 Macropsis Lewis, 1834
 Macropsidius Ribaut, 1952
 Oncopsis Burmeister, 1838
 Paragalboa Yang, Dietrich & Zhang, 2016
 Pedionis Hamilton, 1980
 Pediopsis Burmeister, 1838
 Pediopsoides Matsumura, 1912
 Reticopsella Viraktamath, 1996
 Reticopsis Hamilton, 1980
 Ruandopsis Linnavuori, 1978
 Stenopsoides Evans, 1941
 Stenoscopus Evans, 1934
 Toropsis Hamilton, 1980
 Varicopsella Hamilton, 1980
 Zelopsis Evans, 1966

References

Further reading

External links

 

Eurymelinae
Cicadellidae